Analia Pigrée (born 31 July 2001) is a French Guianese swimmer who competes internationally representing France. She is the French record holder in the long course and short course 50 metre backstroke and the short course 100 metre backstroke. In the 50 metre backstroke, she won the gold medal at the 2022 European Aquatics Championships (long course), a silver medal at the 2021 European Short Course Championships, and the bronze medal at the 2022 World Aquatics Championships (long course). In the 100 metre backstroke, she won the bronze medal at the 2021 European Short Course Championships.

Background
Pigrée was born 31 July 2001 in Cayenne, French Guiana. One of the swimmers Pigrée was inspired by growing up was Malia Metella.

Career

2021
At the French Championships held in Chartres, France in June 2021, Pigrée broke the French record in the 50 metre backstroke, set in 2018 by Béryl Gastaldello, with a time of 27.81 seconds in the prelims heats on 18 June. In the final of the 50 metre backstroke later the same day, she lowered her own French record by over two-tenths of a second to 27.59 seconds. About six weeks later, at the 2021 Spanish Summer Open Championships in Las Palmas, Spain, Pigrée set a new French record in the 50 metre backstroke on 3 August with a time of 27.39 seconds.

2021 European Short Course Championships

In the semifinals of the 50 metre backstroke at the 2021 European Short Course Championships, held at the Palace of Water Sports in Kazan, Russia, Pigrée swam a personal best time of 26.05 seconds, which advanced her to the final of the event ranked first. In the final of the event on 5 November, Pigrée won the silver medal in a time of 26.08 seconds, finishing behind Kira Toussaint of the Netherlands. About the outcome, Pigrée said to Swimming World, "First international competition, first final and first medal. This is just insane! This race was really close to my heart and really wanted to represent France well." For the 100 metre backstroke, Pigrée swam a time of 56.40 seconds in the final of the event, which earned her the bronze medal and broke the former French record of 57.16 seconds set by Laure Manaudou in 2008. At the end of the Championships, when swimmers were ranked by their best individual performance at the Championships in terms of points earned for one swim, Pigrée ranked as the number five female competitor for her swim of 26.05 seconds in the semifinals of the 50 metre backstroke, which earned her 949 points and was rewarded with €12,000.

2021 World Short Course Championships
For the 2021 World Short Course Championships at Etihad Arena in Abu Dhabi, United Arab Emirates in December, Pigrée entered to compete in the 50 metre backstroke and 100 metre backstroke individual events. On the first day of competition, Pigrée ranked 19th in the prelims heats of the 100 metre backstroke with a time of 58.63 seconds and did not qualify for the semifinals. In the prelims heats of the 4×50 metre medley relay on day two, Pigrée split a 24.72 for the freestyle leg of the relay, helping achieve a time of 1:48.49 and rank of ninth overall. Pigrée swam the anchor leg on the 4×50 metre mixed freestyle relay in the prelims heats as well, helping advance the relay to the final ranked sixth with her split of 24.30 seconds. For the finals relay, Marie Wattel substituted in for Pigrée and the relay placed sixth. On the fourth day, Pigrée swam a 26.39 in prelims heat seven of the 50 metre backstroke, tied Maaike de Waard of the Netherlands and both swimmers qualified for the semifinals ranking fifth. In the semifinals Pigrée ranked fifth with a time of 26.07 seconds and qualified for the final. For the final of the 50 metre backstroke Pigrée set a new French record with a time of 25.96 and placed fourth overall, finishing one-tenth of a second behind bronze medalist Louise Hansson of Sweden. Day six, the final day of competition, Pigrée helped qualify the 4×50 metre freestyle relay team to the final ranking sixth, splitting a 24.74 for the third leg of the relay. She anchored the relay in 24.43 in the final, helping achieve a seventh-place finish.

2022
At the 2022 French National Championships in Limoges Métropole, Pigrée placed fourth in the 100 metre backstroke with a time of 1:01.22 seconds. The third day of competition, she achieved a 2022 World Aquatics Championships qualifying time of 27.72 seconds and second-place finish in the 50 metre backstroke. On day five, she placed fourth in the final of the 50 metre butterfly with a time of 26.73 seconds. For the 50 metre freestyle on the sixth and final day, she finished seventh in the final with a time of 25.81 seconds, which was less than one second behind first-place finisher Marie Wattel.

2022 World Aquatics Championships

For the 2022 World Aquatics Championships, with pool swimming competition conducted at Danube Arena in Budapest, Hungary in June, Pigrée entered to compete in two individual events, the 100 metre backstroke, with an entry time of 59.88 seconds she achieved in December 2021 during the qualifying period, and the 50 metre backstroke, with an entry time of 27.41 seconds she achieved on 9 December 2021 and in the qualifying period. On the second day of pool swimming competition, she qualified for the semifinals of the 100 metre backstroke with a time of 1:01.13 and overall 16th rank in the preliminaries. In the semifinals, she placed sixteenth with a time of 1:01.59 and did not advance to the final. On day four, she ranked fifth in the preliminaries of the 50 metre backstroke, qualifying for the semifinals with a time of 27.75 seconds. For the semifinals, she set a new French record in the event with a time of 27.29 seconds, which was 0.31 seconds off the world record of 26.98 seconds set by Liu Xiang of China in 2018, and qualified for the final the following day ranking second. In the final, she won the bronze medal with a time of 27.40 seconds.

2022 European Aquatics Championships

On the third day of the 2022 European Aquatics Championships, held in August in Rome, Italy, Pigrée ranked first in the prelims heats of the 50 metre backstroke with a time of 27.53 seconds and qualified for the semifinals. She ranked third in the semifinals, finishing in a time of 27.68 seconds and qualifying for the final. In the final, swimming in the outdoor pool at Foro Italico (Stadio Olimpico del Nuoto), she won the gold medal with a personal best and French record time of 27.27 seconds. The gold medal and European title marked her first time achieving a title at an international, continental or world, championships. In the preliminaries of the 100 metre backstroke the following day, she ranked tenth overall with a time of 1:01.24 and did not qualify for the semifinals as she was not one of the two fastest swimmers representing France.

In October, at the 2022 FINA Swimming World Cup in Berlin, Germany, Pigrée competed in three individual events, placing thirteenth in the 50 metre backstroke with a 26.92, eighteenth in the 100 metre backstroke with a time of 59.22 seconds, and 24th in the 50 metre freestyle with a 25.16.

2022 World Short Course Championships
Day one of the 2022 World Short Course Championships in December in Melbourne, Australia, Pigrée placed twenty-fourth in the 100 metre backstroke on day one with a time of 58.50 seconds. On the third morning, she qualified for the semifinals of the 50 metre backstroke from the morning preliminaries, where she ranked sixteenth with a time of 26.54 seconds. In the evening, she lowered her time and placed eleventh with a 26.26. The morning of day five, she led-off the 4×50 metre medley relay with a time of 26.49 seconds, helping qualify the relay for the final ranking third with a French record time of 1:44.86. In the final, she lowered her time to a 26.30 to help finish in a French record time of 1:43.96 and place sixth.

International championships (50 m)

International championships (25 m)

 Prigrée swam only in the prelims heats.

Personal best times

Long course metres (50 m pool)

Short course metres (25 m pool)

National records

Long course metres (50 m pool)

Legend: h – heat; sf – semifinal

Short course metres (25 m pool)

Legend: h – preliminary heat

See also
 List of French records in swimming
 List of European Short Course Swimming Championships medalists (women)

References

External links
 

2001 births
Living people
Sportspeople from Cayenne
French Guianan female swimmers
French female backstroke swimmers
World Aquatics Championships medalists in swimming
European Aquatics Championships medalists in swimming